Aksenov is a rural locality (a khutor) in Verkhnekardailskoye Rural Settlement, Novonikolayevsky District, Volgograd Oblast, Russia. The population was 3 as of 2010.

Geography 
Aksenov is located in steppe, on the Khopyorsko-Buzulukskaya Plain, on the right bank of the Kupava River, 36 km northeast of Novonikolayevsky (the district's administrative centre) by road. Verkhnekardailsky is the nearest rural locality.

References 

Rural localities in Novonikolayevsky District